Xenoplaxa is a moth genus in the family Autostichidae. It contains the species Xenoplaxa seraf, which is found in Syria.

References

Symmocinae